The Chevrolet Celebrity is a mid-size automobile that was manufactured and marketed by the Chevrolet division of General Motors for model years 1982-1990.  Replacing the Malibu, the Celebrity was initially marketed between the Citation and the Impala within the Chevrolet model line, eventually marketed between the Corsica and Caprice sedans.   

The Celebrity shared the front-wheel drive A platform with the Cutlass Ciera, Pontiac 6000 and Buick Century.  As part of their legacy, together the A-bodies became enormously popular — as well as synonymous with GM's most transparent examples of badge engineering, highlighted almost indistinguishably on the August 22, 1983 cover of Fortune as examples of genericized uniformity, embarrassing the company and ultimately prompting GM to recommit to design leadership.
   
 
After a single generation of the model line was produced, the Celebrity sedan was discontinued after the 1989 model year and replaced by the Lumina; the Celebrity station wagon was replaced by the Lumina APV minivan after 1990.

Model overview
Introduced in January 1982, the Chevrolet Celebrity was offered in two-door and four-door notchback sedan body styles.  Chevrolet was the first GM division to transition its mid-size sedans to front-wheel drive, producing the Celebrity alongside its Malibu predecessor for both 1982 and 1983. 

The Celebrity nameplate was first used by General Motors in the early 1960s for a pillared sedan version of the Oldsmobile 88.

Chassis 
The Celebrity is based on the GM A-body platform.  Introduced for 1982 as the successor of the previous rear-wheel drive A-body platform (renamed as the G-body for 1982), the new architecture marked the expansion of front-wheel drive from the compact segment into mid-size vehicles.  To lower development and production costs, the A platform shares design commonality with the compact-car X platform, with the Celebrity sharing its 104.9 inch wheelbase with the Chevrolet Citation.   While not as extensive as a reduction as a downsizing as the 1977 Impala/Caprice, the 1978 Malibu, or the 1980 Citation, the Celebrity lost approximately 4 inches in length and 2 inches of width over the Malibu.  

While derived from the X-body chassis, the A-body platform would not share entirely in its controversial recall issues.  There were driveability problems with the computerized engine control system in 1982 models, and deterioration of the upper engine mount (also called a dogbone) caused engine/transaxle vibration.

The Celebrity was available with 2 different bolt patterns on the wheel hub, either 100mm (JA1 code) or 115mm (JA2 code); the transaxles and brakes were different on these two patterns.  The smaller of the bolt pattern was used in the standard models and used a non-vented disc brake while the larger bolt pattern was to house the heavy duty vented disc brakes.  A misconception is that all Eurosport models came with the larger bolt pattern, but this was not the case. Most examples equipped with heavy-duty braking systems were base model vehicles intended for fleet and taxi use.

Powertrain 
For its 1982 launch, the Celebrity was offered with three engines, carrying over a 2.5L inline-four and a 2.8L V6 from the Citation.  A 4.3L diesel V6 (effectively,  of the Oldsmobile diesel V8) served as an additional option; a three-speed automatic was paired with all three engines.  

For 1984, Chevrolet introduced the 130 hp "H.O." version of the 2.8L engine (from the Citation X-11); a 4-speed manual was introduced alongside a 4-speed automatic (for 2.8L engines).  For 1985, the 2.8L HO V6 received fuel injection; the 2.5L engine followed suit for 1986 (branded Tech IV).  In another change, the diesel V6 was quietly removed from the model line.

For 1987, the engine line was pared to two, as the fuel-injected HO V6 became the only V6 engine offering.  The Celebrity now came was offered with three transmissions: a three-speed automatic (standard), a four-speed automatic (optional for V6), and a 5-speed Getrag-supplied manual (optional for V6).  

For 1988, the 2.5L engine received additional balance shafts; the 5-speed transmission was dropped for 1989.  For 1990 (station wagons only), an optional 3.1L V6 replaced the 2.8L engine, paired to either a 3 or 4-speed automatic.
 1982–1990 Tech IV 2.5 L (151 in³) TBI I4
 1982–1986 2.8 L (173 in³) 2 bbl carbureted V6 (RPO LE2)
 1984 2.8 L (173 in³) 2 bbl carbureted V6 (RPO LH7)
 1985–1989 2.8 L (173 in³) MPFI V6 (RPO L44 (iron head, '85-'86) and LB6 (aluminum head, '87-'89))
 1984–1985 4.3 L (263 in³) Diesel V6
 1990 3.1 L (191 in³) MPFI V6 (RPO LH0)

Body 
The Celebrity shares its roofline with the 1982-1988 Buick Century and is distinguished from other A-platform vehicles by its coved rear fascia.  For 1984, Chevrolet introduced a five-door Celebrity station wagon with a liftgate and hatchback rear window; for the first time since 1977, a mid-size Chevrolet station wagon was available with a third-row seat.    

Throughout its production, Chevrolet introduced few updates to the model line, with minor exterior updates in 1984, 1986, and 1987.  For 1987, the hoodline was lowered slightly, distinguished by the introduction of composite headlamp lenses and a smaller grille design.  In 1986, the rear fascia was revised, adding wraparound taillamp lenses and a center-mount brake lamp (CHMSL).  To comply with passive-restraint regulations, the model line received door-mounted seatbelts for 1990 (in place of airbags).

Trim 
During its nine-year run, the Celebrity was available with various trim/option packages including CS, CL, Estate (which added exterior simulated woodgrain applique on wagons), Eurosport, and Eurosport VR.

Celebrity Eurosport 
One of the most popular versions of the Chevrolet Celebrity is the Celebrity Eurosport. Introduced in 1984 as an option package, the Eurosport is both a cosmetic and performance option package for the Chevrolet Celebrity. Distinguished by its black window trim and red emblems, the Eurosport was offered with the 2.8L HO V6 from the Citation X-11 as an option (along with any Celebrity powertrain). Other parts of the Eurosport package include a heavy-duty F41 suspension, black steering wheel and 14" Sport Rallye wheels (which became an option for all Celebrity sedans/wagons). The interior was given model-specific red emblems on the door panels and dashboard.

For the 1988 model year, the Olympic Eurosport edition was offered in Canada as a tie-in to the Calgary Winter Olympics. Offered only in monochrome white, with all blackout trim exterior painted white to match the body. The only interior colour trim was saddle, with an Olympic logo mounted on the B pillar.

Celebrity Eurosport VR 
Based on the 1986 Chevrolet Eurosport RS concept car, Chevrolet offered the Celebrity Eurosport VR limited edition option package for 1987 and 1988.  Converted by Autostyle Cars, near Oklahoma City Assembly, the Eurosport VR was fitted with ground effects, body decals, a blacked-out grille, and aluminum wheels.  The Eurosport VR was produced in only four colors: red, silver, black, and white.

For 1987, the VR was offered for the four-door sedan and station wagon and are distinguished by their interior, which includes red carpeting, special tri-color door panels, bucket seats with thigh bolsters, and a rear seat cup holder.  For 1988, two-door versions were produced as well and were produced with interiors from a standard Celebrity or Celebrity CL.

Discontinuation 

Following the 1987 model year, General Motors ended regular updates to the Celebrity, concentrating on development of the Chevrolet Lumina.  Coinciding with declining sales of sedan-based coupes, the two-door Celebrity was dropped after the 1988 model year; outliving the Caprice two-door by a year, the body style gave way to the Beretta and Lumina two-doors (the latter, marketed as the successor to the Monte Carlo).   

The four-door Celebrity sedan ended sales after the 1989 model year (marketed alongside its 1990 Lumina successor).  For 1990, Chevrolet only offered the Celebrity as a station wagon. As of current production, it remains the final mid-size wagon offered by Chevrolet in North America.  

Following the 1991 discontinuation of the Pontiac 6000, the A-body Buick Century and Oldsmobile Cutlass Ciera were produced nearly unchanged until the end of the 1996 model year.

Production 
During the 1980s, within Chevrolet, the Celebrity competed with the Cavalier as the highest-selling car of the brand, overtaking the Cavalier in sales for 1986 and 1987.  For 1986, the Celebrity was the highest-selling car in the United States; as of current production, it remains the final time a Chevrolet vehicle (or any GM-brand vehicle) has done so.   
Production Figures:

Notes

External links
 GM A-body cars information
 Chevy Celebrity Club of America

Celebrity
Front-wheel-drive vehicles
Mid-size cars
Sedans
Station wagons
Cars introduced in 1982
1980s cars
1990s cars
Motor vehicles manufactured in the United States
Cars discontinued in 1990